Paphiopedilum philippinense is a species of orchid occurring from the Philippines to northern Borneo.

References

External links 

philippinense
Orchids of the Philippines
Orchids of Borneo